Doris Beatriz Petroni (born 4 December 1941) is an Argentine choreographer, dancer, and dance teacher. She was married to the musician and arranger  until his death in 2001.

Career
Doris Petroni studied at the National School of Dance, where she obtained her teaching degree. She then continued her artistic training in dance with teachers such as María Ruanova, Paulina Ossona, Luisa Grinberg, Ana Itelman, and Renate Schotteluis, and in the theater with Ricardo Bartis, Beatriz Mattar, and Agustín Alezzo.

She was part of several stable groups, such as those of Renate Shottelius and Jorge Tomín. She joined the Contemporary Ballet of the Teatro General San Martín (under the direction of ), and subsequently, from 1990 to 1997, coordinated it with him.

Petroni participated in the Friends of Dance and Open Dance Group and choreographed countless plays, as well as television shows such as La culpa fue de Gardel, Prohibido pisar el Tango, and Las tres medias de Andrés. She contributed to the television programs of Nicolás Repetto (in Paraguay) and Alejandro Dolina. She was a teacher at the National School of the Arts and at the Teatro Colón, and conducts workshops specializing in movement techniques.

Reviews
In his review of the production of The Trojan Women, with choreography and direction by Oscar Araiz,  notes:

Awards
Petroni was nominated for the ACE Award for the best choreography of the 2002–2003 season.

Works

Shows

Choreographer

References

External links
 

1941 births
20th-century Argentine dancers
20th-century Argentine educators
Argentine women educators
Argentine musical theatre choreographers
Argentine musical theatre female dancers
Dance teachers
Living people
People from General López Department
Tango dancers